Joseph Honoré Ricard (3 December 1880 – December 1948) was a French agronomist who was active in agricultural unions. He was Minister of Agriculture in 1921–22.

Life

Joseph Honoré Ricard was born in Le Bouscat, Gironde, on 3 December 1880.
He studied at the National Agronomical Institute, where he was a brilliant student.
He then became a specialist in the problems of mutuality, insurance and organization of trade unions.
Ricard held important positions in the Union of Agricultural Syndicates (union des syndicats agricoles) and the Society of Farmers of France (Société des agriculteurs de France).

During World War I (1914–18) Ricard was mobilized, then released to hold various positions in the Ministry of Agriculture.
He set up an organization where the unemployed and refugees were put to work in the fields.
He was head of the Department of Immigration and Agricultural Labor.
In 1919 he founded the National Confederation of Agricultural Associations.

Ricard was a member of the steering committee of the Congrès de la natalité, first held in Nancy in 1919.
The participants at the congress decided the main tasks for family policy were to fight pornography, abortion, and neo-Malthusian propaganda; to fight slums and housing construction projects; to support the vote familial; and to work toward expansion of family benefits; subsidies for nornbreuses; and a "moral reform of intelligences and wills".
Although not a deputy, Ricard was appointed Minister of Agriculture from 20 January 1920 to 15 January 1921 in the first and second cabinets of Alexandre Millerand and the cabinet of Georges Leygues.

Ricard was a member of the Academy of Agriculture where he replaced Jules Méline.
Ricard founded Radio-Agricole Française (RAF) in 1927.
The RAF promoted the value of radio in allowing rural families to stay in touch with the world.
Paul Brenot, as vice-president of the Syndicat Professionel des Industries Radioélectriques, became a member of the group
He was commander of the Legion of Honour.
Joseph Ricard died in December 1948.

Publications

Publications by Joseph Ricard included:

Notes

Sources

1880 births
1948 deaths
French Ministers of Agriculture
French agronomists